Marcel Feye (8 March 1883 – 8 October 1965) was a Belgian footballer. He played in five matches for the Belgium national football team from 1907 to 1910.

References

External links
 

1883 births
1965 deaths
Belgian footballers
Belgium international footballers
Place of birth missing
Association football goalkeepers